Patrícia França Monteiro de Oliveira (September 28, 1971, Recife, Brazil) is a Brazilian actress.

Biography 

She began her career in theater as a child and won awards, including the play A Ver Estrelas. Her first job was in the national headlines Tereza Batista miniseries, produced by Rede Globo. Rede Globo, gained prominence in the novels Sonho Meu, Suave Veneno (being the cover of national soundtrack) and A Padroeira, plus a cameo in Chocolate com Pimenta.

After ten years of returns in 2014 on Rede Globo interpreting Delma in Malhação, mother of a teenager who dreams of becoming a rockstar.

Personal life 

Was married to actor Ilya São Paulo between 1995 and 1997 and systems analyst Paulo Lins between 1999 and 2006, being the father of her first daughter, and Fernanda. She married since 2008 with entrepreneur Wagner Pontes, who had her second child Gabriel.

Filmography

Television

Films 
1991 - A Última Terra (direct to video)
1992 - Contos de Balneário (direct to video)
1993 - O Calor da Pele.... Zélia
1994 - Chuvas e Trovoadas.... Teacher's daughter (short film)
1996 - Tieta do Agreste.... Imaculada / Tieta (young)
1999 - Orfeu.... Eurídice
2000 - Chega de Cangaço
2003 - As Tranças de Maria.... Maria
2008 - Mãos de Vento, Olhos de Dentro.... mother of Tico (short film)
2009 - Flordelis - Basta uma Palavra para Mudar.... mother of Beá

Theater 
1985 - A Ver Estrelas
1994 - Peer Gynt.... Solveig
1994 - Aladim.... Jasmine
1995 - Péricles, príncipe de Tiro.... Marina
2002 - Terceiras Intenções.... Ana Paula
2006 - A Beata Maria do Egito.... beata
2015 - Ou Tudo ou Nada
2016 - Quando Eu For Mãe, Quero Amar Desse Jeito

References

External links 

1971 births
Living people
Actresses from Recife
Brazilian television actresses
Brazilian telenovela actresses
Brazilian film actresses
Brazilian stage actresses